The Lagos Food Bank Initiative (LFBI) was established to tackle hunger, reduce food wastages and provide emergency food solutions through their network of Food banks across Lagos state. LFBI's aims to achieve their goals by creating, supplying, and strengthening new food banks and in all the twenty (20) Local Governments Areas in Lagos State. LFBI works with religious organisations, corporate entities and individuals to achieve their main objectives. LFBI's main targets are: seniors aged 50 years and above; children aged 5–16 years; the destitute; extremely indigent families and widows.

See also

 List of food banks

References

External links 
 

Food banks in Nigeria
Non-profit organizations based in Lagos